North Star Middle School or Northstar Middle School may refer to:

 North Star Middle School, a former middle school within the Lincoln North Star High School, Lincoln, Nebraska 
 North Star Middle School, in the North Star School District, Boswell, Pennsylvania
 Northstar Middle School, in the Lake Washington School District, King County, Washington
 Northstar Middle School, in the Eau Claire Area School District, Wisconsin